The fontaine de la Régénération or fontaine d'Isis is a monument erected in 1793 at the former site of the Bastille in Paris, during a festival to commemorate the anniversary of 10 August, 1792.

It featured a statue of goddess Isis flanked by two lions, with water springing from her breasts.

References

1793 establishments in France
Statues in France
Sculptures of lions